Miguel Grau is a Peruvian football club  based in the city of Abancay, Apurímac, Peru. 

The club is the biggest of Abancay city, and one of the biggest in the Apurímac Province.

The club was founded in 1955 and plays in the Copa Perú, which is the third division of the Peruvian league.

History
Club Deportivo Miguel Grau was founded with the name of Club Deportivo Miguel Grau in honor to the Peruvian naval officer Miguel Grau. The club adopted the name of Club Unión Grauína Abancay until 2004.

 In the 1976 Copa Perú, the club classified to the National Stage, but was eliminated. 

In the 1980 Copa Perú, the club classified to the National Stage, but was eliminated. 

In the 1998 Copa Perú, the club classified to the National Stage as Unión Grauína, but was eliminated by Coronel Bolognesi. 

In the 2004 Copa Perú, the club classified to the National Stage as Unión Grauína, but was eliminated by Senati FBC.

Rivalries
Miguel Grau has had a long-standing rivalry with Deportivo Educación.

Honours

Regional
Región VI: 
Winners (1): 1998

Región VIII:
 Runner-up (1): 2004

Liga Departamental de Apurimac:
Winners (11): 1967, 1970, 1972, 1973, 1978, 1979, 1987, 1989, 1998, 2014, 2019
 Runner-up (2): 2004, 2017

Liga Distrital de Abancay: 2
Winners (10): 1967, 1970, 1972, 1976, 1978, 1987, 1998, 2007, 2010, 2014
 Runner-up (5): 2011, 2015, 2016, 2017, 2019

See also
List of football clubs in Peru
Peruvian football league system

External links

Football clubs in Peru
Association football clubs established in 1955
1955 establishments in Peru